Dunnrock is a coastal locality in the Mackay Region, Queensland, Australia.

History 
The locality was allegedly named after farmer S. Dunn, who cut a track to the township site. Dunn was the lessee of Portion 8V, Parish of Chelona. The locality was named and bounded by the Minister for Natural Resources 3 September 1999.

Geography
Sandy Creek forms the southern and south-eastern boundaries.

References 

Mackay Region
Coastline of Queensland
Localities in Queensland